Dhani Poonia or Poonia Ki Dhani  is a village in Taranagar tehsil of Churu district in Rajasthan.

Location 
It is situated in 50 km northeast direction of Churu city and 27 km southeast of Taranagar. Its neighbouring villages are Jharsar Chhota, Chimanpura, Rajpura, Satyun.

Jat Gotras 
Poonia
Karwasra
Mundariya
 Sunia

Population 
As of the census of 2011, there are 867 people out of them 437 are male and 430 are female.

Economy 
The main occupation of the villagers is agriculture. There are 40 persons serving the Indian Army, Central and State Govts. About 15 people have gone to Arab countries for earning.

Education 
Dhani Poonia is considered to be a progressive village of the region. There is a Government Upper Primary School. Secondary and Higher Secondary education students go to Chimanpura and Taranagar.

Religion 
All people belong to Hindu religion. There is one temple of Hanumanji and one Medi of Gogaji.

References

Villages in Churu district